The following is a list of Major League Baseball players, retired or active. As of the end of the 2011 season, there have been 461 players with a last name that begins with J who have been on a major league roster at some point.

J

References

External links
Last Names starting with J – Baseball-Reference.com

 J